Joseph O'Connor (born 1997) is an Irish hurler who plays for Wexford Championship club St. Martins GAA and at inter-county level with the Wexford senior hurling team. He usually lines out as a full-back or centre-back.

Career

O'Connor is a member of the O'Connor hurling dynasty that includes 1996 All-Ireland Championship-winners George and John O'Connor and current players Rory and Jack O'Connor. He first came to hurling prominence at juvenile and underage levels with the St Martin's club and was a member of their County Championship-winning teams in 2017 and 2019. O'Connor first played at inter-county level during a two-year stint with the Wexford minor team before later lining out with the under-21 team. He was just out of the minor grade when he was drafted onto the Wexford senior hurling team in 2016 and was a panel member during the 2019 Leinster Championship win.

Honours

Shelmaliers
Wexford Senior Hurling Championship: 2017, 2019

Wexford
Leinster Senior Hurling Championship: 2019

References

1997 births
Living people
Irish schoolteachers
St Martin's (Wexford) hurlers
Wexford inter-county hurlers